Eduardo Ruberté Bisó (5 May 1918 – 30 March 1996) was a Puerto Rican real estate broker and Mayor of Ponce, Puerto Rico, from 1964 to 1968.

Early years
Ruberté Bisó was the son of Dario Ruberté Casiano and Maria Bisó Hernandez, and married Eugenia Cordero Suárez on 7 June 1942. Ruberté Bisó had a sister from the same marriage, 7 years his younger, named Matilde. He worked as an assistant bookkeeper in the banking industry. His second wife was Olga Huertas. Later he worked his way into real estate brokerage.

Mayoral term
Ruberté Bisó is best remembered for the inauguration of the new city cemetery in the El Yeso sector of the city, near the community of Jaime L. Drew. He is also remembered for having dealt successfully with a citywide strike by municipal sanitation workers.

Death and legacy
Ruberté Bisó died in Cuarto, Ponce, Puerto Rico, on 30 March 1996. The cause of his death was "cardio-respiratory arrest."  He was buried at Cementerio La Piedad in Ponce. In Ponce, there is a street that bears his name, located in the Pampanos sector of Barrio Canas.  The road is signed PR-585 and it leads from Barrio Canas to Barrio Playa.

See also
 Ponce, Puerto Rico
 List of Puerto Ricans

References

Further reading
 Fay Fowlie de Flores. Ponce, Perla del Sur: Una Bibliográfica Anotada. Second Edition. 1997. Ponce, Puerto Rico: Universidad de Puerto Rico en Ponce. p. 173. Item 880. 
 Carnaval de Ponce: programa. Ponce, Puerto Rico. 196x? - . Includes photos. (Archivo Histórico Municipal de Ponce, AHMP; Colegio Universitario Tecnológico de Ponce, CUTPO)

External links
 Photo of Mayor Ruberte Biso in 1966

Mayors of Ponce, Puerto Rico
Burials at Cementerio La Piedad
1918 births
1996 deaths